"A Ram Sam Sam (A rum sum sum)" is a popular Moroccan children's song and game, that gained popularity around the world, other variants were used like "Aram" instead of "A Ram" and "Zam Zam" instead of "Sam Sam".

Lyrics, movements and meaning
The song's lyrics are usually:

 A ram sam sam, a ram sam sam
 Guli guli guli guli guli ram sam sam
 A ram sam sam, a ram sam sam
 Guli guli guli guli guli ram sam sam
 A rafiq, a rafiq
 Guli guli guli guli guli ram sam sam
 A rafiq, a rafiq
 Guli guli guli guli guli ram sam sam

The song is an Arabic song, sung in the Moroccan dialect. The lyrics are as following
 A ram sam sam: Sam Ran
Guli guli guli: tell me, tell me, tell me
A rafiq: friend, companion

When not played as a game, this song is frequently sung as a round.

The game is played by a group of children. The song is sung by the group leader and the participants should perform several actions during certain lyrics, usually:
 A ram sam sam - pound fists, right over left, then left over right.
 Guli guli - pull hands apart gesturing as if something were gooey
 A rafiq - spin index fingers on either side of the head (like someone is crazy), ending with the fingers pointed up.

A version of the song by Liverpool folk group The Spinners, who claimed to have learned the song from an Israeli singer and that the words were in Aramaic, had the following lyrics:
 Aram sa-sa, aram sa-sa,
 Gulli gulli gulli gulli gulli gulli ram ra-sa. (2x)
 Arami, arami,
 Gulli gulli gulli gulli gulli gulli ram ra-sa. (2x)

The translation they gave was "Get up on your horse and gallop away". When they performed the song, the group would make it an audience-participation song, splitting the audience into two halves and encouraging them to sing it as a round.

Pop culture usage 
 The Spinners included a version of the song on their 1964 album Folk at the Phil, under the title "Aram Sa-sa".
 Rolf Harris recorded the song in 1971 for Columbia Records with The Mike Sammes Singers This version contains additional lyrics and distinctive arrangement with backing vocals. 
 Wee Sing included the song in their 1989 children's musical video Wee Sing in Sillyville. 
 The Basque clown trio Pirritx, Porrotx eta MariMotots made a version when they were called Takolo, Pirritx eta Pirrutx called Aran-txan-txan.
 Producer Levon Atayan created pop-dance version and called “Aram Zam Zam” in 2009.
 Diskoteka Avariya, a Russian band, used the song in their composition "Modnyi Tanets Aram Zam Zam" (In Russian  "Модный танец Арам Зам Зам" English title "A Ram Sam Sam: The Trendy Dance") in 2009.
 Donikkl und die Weißwürschtl recorded a German version "Aram Sam Sam".
 Gracey released a Dutch language version in 2011 that reached No. 75 on the singles charts in the Netherlands. 
 Lorenz Büffel recorded a version entitled "Aramsamsam" for his double CD Après Ski Hits 2011.

Interpolation
 Tom Tom Club used part of the "A Ram Sam Sam" lyrics in their song "Wordy Rappinghood". This song is found on their self-titled debut album from 1981.
 Chicks on Speed recorded a cover version of the song "Wordy Rappinghood" on their 2003 album 99 Cents.
 Uffie recorded a cover version of "Wordy Rappinghood" in collaboration with DJ Mehdi.

Parodies and adaptations
 The Jewish educational television series The Magic Door, which aired in the Chicago area from 1962 to 1982, had a theme song "A Room Zoom Zoom", based on the first two lines of "A Ram Sam Sam". 
 The US scouting movement adapted the song using new lyrics: A good Cub Scout / A good Cub Scout / A new Tiger Cub and a good Cub Scout...
 Fast Food Rockers recorded a version of the common playground and camp song in 2003 under the title "Fast Food Song" with new lyrics sampling on the refrain and mentioning fast food companies, notably Pizza Hut, Kentucky Fried Chicken and McDonald's.
 DJ Ötzi recorded a very similar version in German language titled "Burger Dance" in 2003, mainly being an enumeration of the same fast food companies as that of the Fast Food Rockers. The song samples on the refrain of A Ram Sam Sam and some sections of "The Battle Hymn of the Republic" particularly "Glory Glory Hallelujah".
  used it in some parts of their first music video, "Aram Sam Sam" being a comic parody of the song with additional lyrics in German and a symbolic use of English lyrics in "Jump, jump, motherfucker".

References

External links

Moroccan folk songs
Songs in Moroccan Arabic (Darija)
Arabic-language children's songs